(20 January 1920 – 19 May 2011) was a 10th Dan aikidoka and founder of the Ki Society and its style of aikido, officially Shin Shin Toitsu Aikido (literally "aikido with mind and body unified"), but commonly known as Ki-Aikido.

Aikido
Koichi Tohei was born 1920 in Shitaya ward (下谷区), presently Taitō, in Tokyo and graduated from the Economics Department of Keio University. As a boy he was sickly and frail, leading his father to recommend Tohei for judo studies. He trained hard and his body prospered, but soon after he began his pre-college studies at Keio University, he developed a case of pleurisy. This forced Tohei to take a year off.

Tohei was distressed at the thought of losing his newfound strength of body and his means of training it, so he decided to replace his judo studies with Zen meditation and misogi exercises, learned at the Ichikukai Dojo in Tokyo. As with his judo studies, Tohei entered the training of the mind with fervor and soon excelled despite his serious health issues. After his recovery from pleurisy, Tohei became convinced that it was his efforts in training his mind and cultivating his ki that had helped him to heal and recover. This stimulated his later development of Kiatsu, a system of treating physical illness by pressing with the fingers and extending the ki into the ill person's body. Tohei describes this as "priming the pump" allowing the person to heal themselves.

After recovering from pleurisy he returned to judo, but Tohei wanted more than just physical training and did not think that judo was the right art for him to practise, although he did continue studying judo until he started aikido.

In 1940, when he was 19, Tohei's judo instructor, Shohei Mori, recommended that Tohei meet with the founder of aikido, Morihei Ueshiba.

According to Tohei, when he first met with an aikido instructor and practiced some techniques at the Ueshiba dojo, he had doubts about aikido and its value to him. That changed when Ueshiba entered the dojo and started to perform his techniques on the instructors. Tohei was still not entirely convinced until Ueshiba asked Tohei to step onto the mat and try to grab him. Tohei's attempts were unsuccessful, and after this personal demonstration by Ueshiba, Tohei asked to enroll on the spot. Tohei continued to train his mind as well as his body with meditation, misogi and aikido.

Tohei trained with Ueshiba for six months before being sent as a representative (dairi) to teach at the Shumei Okawa school and the military police academy. This was before Tohei was ranked as either dan or kyu. Ueshiba presented Tohei with the rank of 5th dan after Tohei had begun his military service.

War years
In 1942, Koichi Tohei graduated from the Economics Department of the prestigious Keio University. In February 1944, after receiving military training, Tohei Sensei was sent leading an infantry unit into occupied China. There he understood, under enemy fire, the importance of calming one's mind in the One Point in the lower abdomen ("seika no itten"). Because of the lack of doctors, Tohei developed during the war the principles of what he later named Kiatsu Therapy, based on sending Ki through the fingertips.
He saw action in China and was stranded there at the end of the war until his repatriation in 1946. Tohei Sensei stated on several occasions that Ki principles such as "extend Ki" and "relax completely" leaving things up to the Universe helped him to stay safe during the war, along with the eighty men under his command.

Post-war years
Beginning in 1953 Koichi Tohei Sensei was responsible for the introduction of Aikido to the West, mainly through regular teaching journeys to Hawaii, but also continental US and Europe. It was the first time the Founder of Aikido allowed for the art to be taught outside Japan. For that reason, Hawaii became a center for diffusion of Aikido in the United States, and remains today an important place for Ki-Aikido.
During his years at the Aikikai, Tohei Sensei taught Aikido to many famous Shihan like Hiroshi Tada, Sadateru Arikawa, Seigo Yamaguchi, Shigenobu Okumura, Kazuo Chiba, Yoshimitsu Yamada and Steven Seagal.

In 1969, Tohei was asked by Ueshiba to accept the new rank of 10th dan, which Tohei accepted, after having previously refused the same offer. The top rank in aikido had been 8th dan, but the ranks were expanded by Ueshiba for practical as well as political reasons.

The above statement may be inaccurate as Gozo Shioda of Yoshinkan Aikido had been awarded the rank of 9th Dan by Ueshiba eight years before any other 9th dans, in 1961.

Creation of the Ki no Kenkyukai
The events leading up to the split between the main aikido organization, the Aikikai, and Tohei were fueled with the death of Morihei Ueshiba in 1969. His son Kisshomaru Ueshiba inherited the title of Doshu. At the time of Ueshiba's death, Tohei was chief instructor of the Hombu Dojo, the headquarters of Aikikai, a title he retained until his official split from Aikikai in 1974.

One of the major causes of the conflict arose from Tohei's emphasis on his principle of ki in aikido. Tohei wanted aikido to focus on these principles, using exercises to both cultivate and test ki in the daily aikido practice. He had already started teaching his new ideas during his own training sessions at Hombu dojo, but the majority of the other instructors would not. There were some who agreed with Tohei's approach, but Tohei's actions were not welcomed by Kisshomaru and most of the senior instructors. They strongly encouraged him not to teach his principles and techniques in the Hombu Dojo. Tohei replied that he had the right to teach it outside Hombu Dojo, which he did.

But the tensions remained among the senior cadre of instructors, who still did not approve of Tohei's focus upon ki. These brewing tensions together with Tohei's general dissatisfaction with the situation culminated in 1971 when he created the Ki No Kenkyukai, with the purpose of promoting the development and cultivation of ki inside aikido, but outside the Aikikai "umbrella". The years of conflict finally cemented Tohei's decision to break away from the Aikikai and teach his own 'ki' style of aikido. On 1 May 1974, Koichi Tohei officially left the Aikikai organization to concentrate on his newly created Ki-aikido and Ki-society.

On 15 May 1974, Tohei sent a letter in English and Japanese to the majority of the dojos both in Japan and abroad, explaining his reasons for the breakaway and his plans involving Ki-aikido and the Ki-society. This breakup came as a shock to many aikidoka throughout the dojos of the world. Tohei was well regarded by many instructors and students. He was seen as the foremost sensei of Aikido after Ueshiba's death. This, in turn, led to several dojos breaking with the Aikikai and joining Tohei in his new style. Tohei's new objective was to coordinate all the dojos who joined him and incorporate them into the organization of Shin Shin Toitsu Aikido: "Aikido with Mind and Body Coordinated". This branch of aikido is still active today even though Tohei himself retired from the day-to-day business of the Ki-aikido section and then concentrated solely on the Ki-society and further personal development of ki.

Notable students
Both before and during his position as head instructor at the Hombu Dojo, Tohei instructed many notable aikidoka. Several of these have since made lasting impacts on aikido in general.

Among these are (in alphabetical order):
 Christopher Curtis, 8th Dan, Chief Instructor, Hawaii Ki Federation, Ki Society Advisor, Europe
Shizuo Imaizumi, 7th Dan Shin Shin Toitsu Aikido, who founded the independent Shin Budo Kai style of aikido.
Harry Kiyoshi Ishisaka, founder of the Orange County Aiki Kai in California in 1964
Roderick Kobayashi, 6th Dan, founder of Seidokan Aikido.
Koretoshi Maruyama, former Chief Instructor and President of Ki Society, who has since founded the independent Aikido Yuishinkai style of aikido.
Shuji Maruyama, founder of Kokikai Aikido
Alan Ruddock, 6th Dan, introduced Aikido to Ireland, founder of the Aiki no Michi.
Steven Seagal, 7th Dan, American action movie actor, producer, writer, director and a Blues singer-songwriter.
 David Shaner, 8th Dan, Chief Instructor, Eastern Ki Federation, Ki Society Advisor, the Eastern Europe/Russia Ki-Aikido 
Roy Y. Suenaka, 8th Dan, founder of Wadokai Aikido
Shinichi Suzuki, 9th Dan, Head Instructor, Maui Ki Aikido Federation
Jon Mamoru Takagi, 6th Dan, founder of Arizona Aikikai.
Fumio Toyoda, 6th Dan, founder of the Aikido Association of America and Aikido Association International.

Death
Tohei died at 9:14 AM, Japan time (GMT +9) on May 19, 2011, after two weeks of being admitted in hospital due to a discomfort in his chest which proved to be inflammation in the lungs. Wataru Hatakeyama, of the Ki Society Headquarters, stated "he went to intensive-care unit (ICU) twice and came back to general ward each time with his strength of Ki, however, his heart got weak little by little this morning and he passed away."

Books by Koichi Tohei 
 Koichi Tohei: Ki in Daily Life - 4889960716 Oxford University Press, USA
 Koichi Tohei: The Book of Ki - 0870403796 Japan Publications, Japan
 Koichi Tohei: Aikido in Daily Life - 0870402218 Japan Publications, Japan
 Koichi Tohei: Kiatsu - 0870405365 Japan Publications, Japan
 Koichi Tohei: Ki Sayings - Ki No Kenkyukai, Japan - privately printed
 Koichi Tohei: This is Aikido - Japan Publications, Japan - out of print
 Koichi Tohei: What is Aikido? -  Rikugei Publishing House, Japan - out of print
 Koichi Tohei: Aikido: The Arts of Self Defense - Rikugei Publishing House, Japan - out of print
 Koichi Tohei: How to Unify Ki - out of print
 Koichi Tohei: Ki Meditations - out of print
 Koichi Tohei: Ki Hygiene - out of print
 Koichi Tohei: How to Develop Ki - out of print
 Koichi Tohei: Ki Breathing Methods - out of print
 Koichi Tohei: Tempu Nakamura and Morihei Ueshiba - Japanese language only
 Koichi Tohei: Extend Ki - Japanese language only
 Koichi Tohei: Power of Ki Book - Japanese language only
 Koichi Tohei: Ki Power Book - Japanese language only
 Koichi Tohei:  Aikido in Daily Life Rikugei Publishing House, Tokyo, 1966
 Koichi Tohei: The Way to Union with Ki - Ki No Kenkyukai, Japan - privately printed

References

External links

Official Ki Society headquarters page for Koichi Tohei
Official Ki Society biography of Koichi Tohei
Books by Koichi Tohei
Koichi Tohei Resources by Aikido Journal
Ki-Aikido U.S.A. Eastern Ki Federation

Japanese aikidoka
1920 births
2011 deaths
People from Tokyo